Jokke Sommer (born 6 June 1986, in Oslo) is a Norwegian professional skydiver and BASE jumper.

Childhood
Jokke Sommer began skydiving in 2007. After selling his dirtbikes in order to gather the funds required for the training, he started a skydiving formation in USA, where he executed more than 200 jumps within 2 months.

The YouTube effect
Back in Norway, Sommer started BASE jumping in 2008. He uploaded his first video to YouTube called Wingsuit Base in Romsdalen, Norway where he jumps from huge cliffs in Norway. This video was seen by over 17,000 people.

Videos

Dream Lines
In 2010, Sommer launched a movie called Dream Lines - Part I where he flies near the cliffs and mountains all over the world.

He launched four episodes of Dream Lines including Dream Lines - Part III that reached more than 10 million views on YouTube and Dream Lines IV which exceeded four million views. In this last, a teaser was dropped one month before the original launch, 14 December 2012, where we can see the different lines that Sommer and his cameraman, Ludovic Woerth, flew during 2012.

The Perfect Flight
In 2013, Sommer appeared in a web series called The Perfect Flight, produced by Epic TV where he performed stunts with the late Ludovic Woerth (who filmed the flights thanks to cameras attached to his helmet), and Espen Fadnes.

In the first episode, they went to Rio in Brazil and fly near Christ the Redeemer. In the second one, the three friends tried to fly under the bridge of Aiguille du Midi, located in the French Alps. Then, they fly between the Tianmen mountains in China, where Espen Fadnes narrowly escaped collision with a cable car. They jumped over Piton des Neiges in the mountains of the Reunion Island in the fourth episode.

Free by Rudimental and Emeli Sandé
In 2013, Sommer featured in a music video for a song by Rudimental and Emeli Sandé, titled "Free." Sommer uses a wingsuit and glides over the Eiger mountains in the Alps, in this video it shows his childhood. When he was young he got bullied by some young kid and he saw an eagle flying and he thought he can fly and be free as well.

Dangerous by Within Temptation
Sommer appeared in the music video for "Dangerous", a song by Dutch symphonic metal band Within Temptation featuring Howard Jones, formerly of Killswitch Engage. The video shows Sommer gliding through the air and performing stunts such as navigating through a narrow gap between two buildings.

References

1986 births
Norwegian skydivers
Living people
Sportspeople from Oslo